Magnolia elegans is a species in the genus Magnolia. It is found in Java and Sumatra.

References

External links
 
 
 Magnolia elegans at The Plant List
 Magnolia elegans at Tropicos

elegans
Flora of Java
Flora of Sumatra
Plants described in 1978